Raimundo Diosdado Caballero (June 19, 1740 – January 16, 1830 or April 28, 1829) was a Catholic miscellaneous writer, chiefly ecclesiastical. 

Born at Palma in the island of Majorca on June 19, 1740. He entered the Society of Jesus on November 15, 1752, held the chair of literature in the Jesuit College at Madrid for several years, and was deported with the other Jesuits to Italy when the Society was suppressed in the Spanish dominions. In his new home Father Caballero developed a varied literary activity. The following are the most important of his works: 

De Primá typographiae hispanicae aetate specimen (Rome, 1793); 
Commentariola critica, primum de discipliná arcani, secundum de linguá evangelicá (Rome, 1798). The author corrects in this work what he considers to be the mistakes of Emmanuel Schelstrate and Hardouin, and offers a proof that the native tongue of Christ and the Apostles was Syriac, not Greek, as Dominicus Diodati (d. 1801) had maintained in his De Christo loquente exercitatio (Naples, 1767). 
Bibliothecae Scriptorum Societatis Jesu supplementa. Supplementum primum (Rome, 1814), 
Supplementum primum (Rome, 1814), 
Supplementum alterum (Rome, 1816).

Father Caballero shows his scriptural knowledge in his Tetraglotton D. Marei Evangelium, et Marcologia critica; and El Evangelio de S. Marcos escrito en latin, griego y hebreo, con los tres alfabetos. 

Not to mention several historical works, we may add here his writings on American subjects: Observaciones americanas, y supplemento critico á la historia de México; Medios para estrechar más la union entre espanoles americanos y europeos; and Consideraciones americanas.

The exact date of his death is uncertain, but it is believed he died at Rome on either January 16, 1830 or April 28, 1829.

Spanish male writers
18th-century Spanish Jesuits
1740 births
1829 deaths
People from Mallorca
19th-century Spanish Jesuits